Samuel Röthlisberger (born 15 August 1996) is a Swiss handball player for TV Bittenfeld and the Swiss national team.

He represented Switzerland at the 2020 European Men's Handball Championship.

References

External links

1996 births
Living people
Swiss male handball players
Sportspeople from Bern
Expatriate handball players
Swiss expatriate sportspeople in Germany
Handball-Bundesliga players